A bronze medal is awarded to the third-place finisher of contests or competitions, usually in sports.

Bronze Medal may also refer to:

Awards
 Bronze Medal of Military Valor, an Italian medal for gallantry
 Bronze Medal for Merit, awarded by the President of the Republic of South Africa
 Bronze Medal for Civil Valor, an Italian medal for civic virtue
 Bronze Medal of Valor (American), awarded by the United States Civil Air Patrol
 CNRS Bronze Medal, awarded by the French National Centre for Scientific Research
 Congressional Bronze Medal, awarded by the United States Congress
 Department of Commerce Bronze Medal, awarded by the United States Department of Commerce
 Dufferin Bronze Medal, a British commendation to Canadian students and athletes
 Home Guard Bronze Medal, a Swedish reward medal

Other
 "The Bronze Medal", a song by Idlewild from the 2000 album 100 Broken Windows